Kyle A. Sleeth (born December 20, 1981) is a former starting pitcher in the Detroit Tigers organization. Once touted as one of Major League Baseball's top prospects, his career in the Tigers' minor league organization was marred by injuries and he progressed no higher than Double-A; nonetheless, he showed enough promise to be placed on the Tigers' 40-man roster.

Career
Sleeth was drafted by the Baltimore Orioles in the 18th round (534th overall) in the 2000 Major League Baseball Draft, but did not sign and instead attended Wake Forest. After the 2001 season, he played collegiate summer baseball for the Cotuit Kettleers of the Cape Cod Baseball League and was named a league all-star. In , Sleeth went undefeated with a 14–0 record with a 2.97 ERA and 113 strikeouts in 118.1 innings pitched. He led the Atlantic Coast Conference in wins, was second in the conference in strikeouts, and third in ERA. Baseball America named Sleeth the top pitching prospect in college baseball that year.

In , Sleeth returned for another year, going 7–3 with a 2.81 ERA and 102 strikeouts. He earned a spot on the All-Conference first team. On March 28, 2003, Sleeth tied the NCAA record for consecutive victories against Duke with his 26th straight win. He lost the bid to break the record losing against Florida State University on April 4, 2003. USA Baseball named Sleeth a finalist for the Golden Spikes Award, given to the top amateur baseball player in the country. In 2019 Sleeth was inducted into the Wake Forest Sports Hall of Fame for his accomplishments as a Demon Deacon.

Sleeth would become the 3rd overall pick in the 1st round in the 2003 Major League Baseball Draft for the Detroit Tigers. He did not sign his professional contract until August, delaying his professional debut until the following year.

He announced his retirement March 28, .

References

External links

1981 births
Living people
Wake Forest University alumni
Lakeland Tigers players
Erie SeaWolves players
Gulf Coast Tigers players
Wake Forest Demon Deacons baseball players
Cotuit Kettleers players
Baseball players from Colorado
People from Thornton, Colorado